EPF School of Engineering (formerly École polytechnique féminine) a French engineering College created in 1925.

The school trains engineers with a multidisciplinary profile, who work in all sectors of industry and services. Each class is made up of approximately 350 students for the generalist training, dual degree courses and apprenticeship students.

Located in Cachan, as well as in Troyes since 2010 and in Montpellier since 2012, the EPF is a private higher education institution of general interest recognised by the State. The school is a member of the Union of Independent Grandes Écoles (UGEI).

The EPF was created in 1994 from the former École polytechnique féminine (which was never linked to the École polytechnique) founded in 1925 by Marie-Louise Paris.

Notable alumni 
 Astrid Guyart, a French right-handed foil fencer, author, and aerospace engineer
 Jade Le Maître, technical director and co-founder of Hease Robotics

References

External links
 EPF School of Engineering

Engineering universities and colleges in France
Montpellier
EPF
Val-de-Marne
Educational institutions established in 1925
1925 establishments in France